Dustin Tyler Hazelett (born April 29, 1986) is a retired American mixed martial artist who had fought as a Welterweight in the Ultimate Fighting Championship.

Background
Hazelett was born in Louisa, Kentucky, USA.
Hazelett began training in martial arts as a sophomore in high school and began training Brazilian jiu-jitsu at the age of 16, going on to earn a black belt under Jorge Gurgel. Hazelett has attended Marshall University, and is in progress to earning his bachelor's degree.

Mixed martial arts career

Early career
Hazelett made his professional mixed martial arts debut in 2004 and compiled a record of 10-2 before being signed by the UFC.

Ultimate Fighting Championship
Hazelett made his UFC debut on October 10, 2006, in a submission loss to Tony DeSouza. Hazelett holds notable wins over Josh Burkman via step-over armbar, transitioned from a whizzer takedown at The Ultimate Fighter 7 Finale and Tamdan McCrory due to a reverse armbar at UFC 91. Each spectacular finish earned Hazelett the Submission of the Night award. His impressive submission victory over Josh Burkman earned Hazelett the "Submission of the Year" award from ESPN partner, Sherdog.com. His next fight was expected to be against Ben Saunders at UFC 96, but had to withdraw due to injury. He was expected to make his return against Karo Parisyan on November 21, 2009 at UFC 106. However, the fight was cancelled after Karo Parisyan bowed out of the match the day before weigh-ins. Dana White stated on his Twitter page that Hazelett would be paid both his fight and win bonuses for the fight.

Hazelett would later agree to face Paul Daley at UFC 108 following Carlos Condit's withdrawal. However, Hazelett lost the fight via first-round knockout and was medically suspended shortly after because of an orbital bone injury.

Hazelett was scheduled to make his return against Dan Hardy at UFC 119 after verbal agreements were made. However, Hazelett withdrew from the bout as he was due to get married in September.
Hazelett faced Rick Story on August 7, 2010 at UFC 117. Hazelett lost to Story by TKO (punches) at 1:15 of the second round.

Hazelett was unsuccessful in his bid when he dropped to Lightweight when he faced Mark Bocek on December 11, 2010 at UFC 124, losing via triangle choke in the 1st round. On December 20 Hazelett was released by the UFC following a three-fight losing streak.

Hazelett has temporarily put a hold to his MMA career to go back to school.

Personal life
Hazelett and his wife had their first child in 2011.  Since his UFC career Dustin has become a full time paramedic in Cabell County WV.

Championships and accomplishments

Mixed martial arts
Ultimate Fighting Championship
Fight of the Night (One time) vs. Josh Burkman
Submission of the Night (Three times) vs. Jonathan Goulet, Josh Burkman, Tamdan McCrory
Submission of the Year (2008) vs. Josh Burkman

Mixed martial arts record

|-
| Loss
| align=center| 12–7
| Mark Bocek
| Submission (triangle choke/armbar)
| UFC 124
| 
| align=center| 1
| align=center| 2:33
| Montreal, Quebec, Canada
| Return to Lightweight
|-
| Loss
| align=center| 12–6
| Rick Story
| TKO (punches)
| UFC 117
| 
| align=center| 2
| align=center| 1:15
| Oakland, California, United States
| 
|-
| Loss
| align=center| 12–5
| Paul Daley
| KO (punches)
| UFC 108
| 
| align=center| 1
| align=center| 2:24
| Las Vegas, Nevada, United States
| 
|-
| Win
| align=center| 12–4
| Tamdan McCrory
| Submission (reverse armbar)
| UFC 91
| 
| align=center| 1
| align=center| 3:59
| Las Vegas, Nevada, United States
| 
|-
| Win
| align=center| 11–4
| Josh Burkman
| Submission (armbar)
| The Ultimate Fighter: Team Rampage vs Team Forrest Finale
| 
| align=center| 2
| align=center| 4:46
| Las Vegas, Nevada, United States
| 
|-
| Loss
| align=center| 10–4
| Josh Koscheck
| KO (head kick and punches)
| UFC 82
| 
| align=center| 2
| align=center| 1:24
| Columbus, Ohio, United States
| 
|-
| Win
| align=center| 10–3
| Jonathan Goulet
| Submission (armbar)
| UFC Fight Night: Thomas vs Florian
| 
| align=center| 1
| align=center| 1:14
| Las Vegas, Nevada, United States
| 
|-
| Win
| align=center| 9–3
| Stevie Lynch
| Submission (anaconda choke)
| UFC 72
| 
| align=center| 1
| align=center| 2:50
| Belfast, Northern Ireland
| 
|-
| Win
| align=center| 8–3
| Diego Saraiva
| Decision (unanimous)
| UFC 67
| 
| align=center| 3
| align=center| 5:00
| Las Vegas, Nevada, United States
| 
|-
| Loss
| align=center| 7–3
| Tony DeSouza
| Submission (kimura)
| Ortiz vs. Shamrock 3: The Final Chapter
| 
| align=center| 1
| align=center| 3:59
| Hollywood, Florida, United States
| 
|-
| Win
| align=center| 7–2
| Chad Reiner
| KO (punches)
| Extreme Challenge 70
| 
| align=center| 1
| align=center| 0:07
| Hayward, Wisconsin, United States
| 
|-
| Win
| align=center| 6–2
| Victor Moreno
| Submission (armbar)
| Extreme Challenge 68
| 
| align=center| 1
| align=center| 1:02
| Hayward, Wisconsin, United States
| 
|-
| Win
| align=center| 5–2
| Mike Cardosa
| Submission (triangle choke)
| Extreme Challenge 68
| 
| align=center| 1
| align=center| 0:48
| Hayward, Wisconsin, United States
| 
|-
| Win
| align=center| 4–2
| Rhalan Gracie
| Decision (split)
| GFC: Team Gracie vs Team Hammer House
| 
| align=center| 3
| align=center| 5:00
| Columbus, Ohio, United States
| 
|-
| Loss
| align=center| 3–2
| Dereck Keasley
| Decision (unanimous)
| Freestyle Fighting Championship 16
| 
| align=center| 2
| align=center| 5:00
| Tunica, Mississippi, United States
| 
|-
| Win
| align=center| 3–1
| John Shackelford
| Submission (rear-naked choke)
| Freestyle Fighting Championship 16
| 
| align=center| 1
| align=center| 2:42
| Tunica, Mississippi, United States
| 
|-
| Loss
| align=center| 2–1
| Junior Assuncao
| TKO (punches)
| Full Throttle 3
| 
| align=center| 1
| align=center| 4:27
| Duluth, Georgia, United States
| 
|-
| Win
| align=center| 2–0
| Jason Ireland
| Submission (triangle choke)
| Hand 2 Hand Combat
| 
| align=center| 1
| align=center| N/A
| Canton, Ohio, United States
| 
|-
| Win
| align=center| 1–0
| Justin Hons
| Submission (armbar)
| KOTC 42: Buckeye Nuts
| 
| align=center| 1
| align=center| N/A
| Dayton, Ohio, United States
|

See also
List of male mixed martial artists

References

External links
 
 

Living people
American male mixed martial artists
Lightweight mixed martial artists
Welterweight mixed martial artists
Mixed martial artists utilizing Brazilian jiu-jitsu
1986 births
Mixed martial artists from Kentucky
American practitioners of Brazilian jiu-jitsu
People awarded a black belt in Brazilian jiu-jitsu
People from Louisa, Kentucky
Ultimate Fighting Championship male fighters